The 2020 United States House of Representatives elections in Washington was held on November 3, 2020, to elect the 10 U.S. representatives from the state of Washington, one from each of the state's 10 congressional districts. The elections coincided with the 2020 U.S. presidential election, as well as other elections to the House of Representatives, elections to the United States Senate and various state and local elections.

Overview

District 1

The 1st congressional district spans the northeastern Seattle suburbs, including Redmond and Kirkland, along the Cascades to the Canada–US border. The incumbent is Democrat Suzan DelBene, was re-elected with 59.3% of the vote in 2018.

Primary election

Candidates

Declared
Jeffrey Beeler Sr. (Republican), Sultan city councilman and candidate for Washington's 1st congressional district in 2018
Derek Chartrand (Republican), sales executive
Suzan DelBene (Democratic), incumbent U.S Representative
Matthew Heines (Independent), educator
Robert Mair (Independent), candidate for Washington's 1st congressional district in 2018
Steve Skelton (Libertarian), office manager
Justin Smoak (Independent), mining engineer

Primary results

General election

Predictions

Results

District 2

The 2nd congressional district encompasses the northern Puget Sound area, including Everett and Bellingham. The incumbent is Democrat Rick Larsen, who was re-elected with 71.3% of the vote in 2018.

Primary election

Candidates

Declared
Jason Call (Democratic), progressive activist
James Golder (Republican), former Idaho state representative (1977–1985)
Cody Hart (Republican), U.S. Navy veteran
Timothy Hazelo (Republican), U.S. Navy veteran
Kari Ilonummi (Republican), blogger
Carrie Kennedy (Republican), activist
Rick Larsen (Democratic), incumbent U.S Representative
Tim Uy (Republican), volunteer firefighter

Endorsements

Primary results

General election

Predictions

Results

District 3

The 3rd district encompasses the southernmost portion of western and central Washington. It includes the counties of Lewis, Pacific, Wahkiakum, Cowlitz, Clark, Skamania, and Klickitat, as well as a small sliver of southern Thurston county. The incumbent is Republican Jaime Herrera Beutler, who was re-elected with 52.7% of the vote in 2018.

Primary election

Candidates

Declared
Jaime Herrera Beutler (Republican), incumbent U.S. Representative
Devin Gray (Democratic)
Martin Hash (Independent), businessman and Democratic candidate for Washington's 3rd congressional district in 2018
Carolyn Long (Democratic), Washington State University Vancouver professor and nominee for Washington's 3rd congressional district in 2018
Davy Ray (Democratic)

Withdrawn
Peter Khalil (Democratic), legal mediator

Endorsements

Primary results

General election

Predictions

Polling

Results

District 4

The 4th congressional district encompasses rural central Washington, including Yakima and Tri-Cities area. The incumbent is Republican Dan Newhouse, was re-elected with 62.8% of the vote in 2018.

Primary election

Candidates
Ryan Cooper (Libertarian), Libertarian candidate for Washington State Senate in 2018
Evan Jones (Independent), community activist
Doug McKinley (Democratic), attorney
Dan Newhouse (Republican), incumbent U.S. Representative
Sarena Sloot (Republican), nurse practitioner
Tracy Wright (Republican), computer programmer

Primary results

General election

Predictions

Results

District 5

The 5th district encompasses eastern Washington, and includes the city of Spokane. The incumbent is Republican Cathy McMorris Rodgers, who was re-elected with 54.8% of the vote in 2018.

Primary election

Candidates

Declared
Stephen Major (Republican), former mortgage broker
Cathy McMorris Rodgers (Republican), incumbent U.S. Representative
Brendan O'Regan (Independent)
Dave Wilson (Democratic), community activist

Withdrawn
Chris Armitage (Democratic), comedian and U.S. Air Force veteran(remained on ballot)
Rob Chase (Republican)

Endorsements

Results

General election

Predictions

Results

District 6

The 6th district is based on the Olympic Peninsula, and includes western Tacoma. The incumbent is Democrat Derek Kilmer, who was re-elected with 63.9% of the vote in 2018.

Primary election

Candidates

Declared
Johny Alberg (Republican)
Stephen Brodhead (Republican), businessman
Derek Kilmer (Democratic), incumbent U.S. Representative
Elizabeth Kreiselmaier (Republican), psychologist
Rebecca Parson (Democratic), Tacoma Area Commission on Disabilities commissioner
Chris Welton (Republican), records technician

Withdrew
Matthew Tirman (Democratic), Bainbridge Island city councilman

Endorsements

Results

General election

Predictions

Results

District 7

The 7th congressional district encompasses most of Seattle, as well Edmonds, Shoreline, Lake Forest Park, Vashon Island, and Burien. The incumbent is Democrat Pramila Jayapal, who was reelected with 83.6% of the vote in 2018.

Primary election

Candidates

Declared
Jack Hughes-Hageman (Democratic)
Pramila Jayapal (Democratic) incumbent U.S Representative
Craig Keller (Republican)
Rick Lewis (Independent)
Scott Sutherland (Republican)

Primary results

General election

Predictions

Results

District 8

The 8th district encompasses the eastern suburbs of Seattle including Sammamish, Maple Valley, Covington, Hobart, Issaquah, and Auburn and stretches into rural central Washington, including Chelan County and Kittitas County, as well as taking in eastern Pierce County. The incumbent is Democrat Kim Schrier, who flipped the district and was elected with 52.4% of the vote in 2018.

Primary election

Candidates

Declared
Keith Arnold (Democratic)
Corey Bailey (Independent), fisherman
Ryan Burkett (no party preference)
Jesse Jensen (Republican), U.S. Army veteran and Amazon senior project manager
James Mitchell (Democratic), entrepreneur
Kim Schrier (Democratic), incumbent U.S. Representative
Dean Saulibio (Trump Republican), U.S. Army veteran
Keith Swank (Republican), former Seattle Police Department officer, candidate for Washington's 8th congressional district in 2012, and candidate for U.S. Senate in 2018

Declined
Reagan Dunn (Republican), King County Councilmember and son of former U.S. Representative Jennifer Dunn

Primary results

Endorsements

General election

Predictions

Results

District 9

The 9th congressional district stretches from small parts of northeastern Tacoma up to southeastern Seattle, taking in the surrounding suburbs, including Federal Way, Des Moines, Kent, SeaTac, Renton, Mercer Island, and Bellevue. The incumbent is Democrat Adam Smith, who was re-elected with 67.9% of the vote in 2018.

Primary election

Candidates

Declared
Doug Basler (Republican)
Jorge Besada (Libertarian)
Joshua Campbell (Republican)
Adam Smith (Democratic), incumbent U.S. Representative

Results

General election

Predictions

Results

District 10

The 10th district includes Olympia and the Tacoma suburbs, including Puyallup, Lakewood, and University Place. The incumbent is Democrat Denny Heck, who was re-elected with 61.5% of the vote in 2018. On December 4, 2019, Heck announced that he will retire from Congress and not seek re-election.

Primary election

Candidates

Declared
Mary Bacon (Democratic), environmental scientist and U.S. Army veteran
Randy Bell (Democratic)
Richard Boyce (Congress Sucks), Independent candidate for Washington's 10th congressional district in 2016
Todd Buckley (Independent), data analyst
Joshua Collins (Essential Workers), truck driver
Beth Doglio (Democratic), state representative
Phil Gardner (Democratic), former district director for U.S. Representative Denny Heck
Don Hewett (Republican), executive engineer
Rian Ingrim (Republican), businessman and U.S. Army Veteran
Dean Johnson (Republican), Puyallup city councilman
Ralph Johnson (Republican)
Eric LeMay (Democratic), businessman
Jackson Maynard (Republican), attorney
Gordon Press (Republican)
Kristine Reeves (Democratic), former state representative
Nancy Dailey Slotnick (Republican), businesswoman and U.S. Army veteran
Marilyn Strickland (Democratic), CEO of the Seattle Metropolitan Chamber of Commerce and former mayor of Tacoma
Ryan Tate (Republican), software engineer
Sam Wright (Democratic)

Declined
Laurie Dolan (Democratic), state representative
Denny Heck (Democratic), incumbent U.S. Representative (running for lieutenant governor)
Sam Hunt (Democratic), state senator
Christine Kilduff (Democratic), state representative
Chris Reykdal (Democratic), Washington Superintendent of Public Instruction (running for reelection)
Cheryl Selby (Democratic), mayor of Olympia
Kim Wyman (Republican), Washington Secretary of State (running for reelection)

Endorsements

Primary results

General election

Predictions

Polling

Results

Notes

Partisan clients

References

External links
 
 
  (State affiliate of the U.S. League of Women Voters)
 

Official campaign websites for 1st district candidates
 Jeffrey Beeler Sr. (R) for Congress
 Suzan DelBene (D) for Congress

Official campaign websites for 2nd district candidates
 Timothy Hazelo (R) for Congress
 Rick Larsen (D) for Congress

Official campaign websites for 3rd district candidates
 Jaime Herrera Beutler (R) for Congress
 Carolyn Long (D) for Congress 

Official campaign websites for 4th district candidates
 Doug McKinley (D) for Congress
 Dan Newhouse (R) for Congress

Official campaign websites for 5th district candidates
 Cathy McMorris Rodgers (R) for Congress
 Dave Wilson (D) for Congress

Official campaign websites for 6th district candidates
 Derek Kilmer (D) for Congress
 Elizabeth Kreiselmaier (R) for Congress

Official campaign websites for 7th district candidates
 Pramila Jayapal (D) for Congress
 Craig Keller (R) for Congress

Official campaign websites for 8th district candidates
 Jesse Jensen (R) for Congress 
 Kim Schrier (D) for Congress

Official campaign websites for 9th district candidates
 Doug Basler (R) for Congress
 Adam Smith (D) for Congress

Official campaign websites for 10th district candidates
 Beth Doglio (D) for Congress
 Marilyn Strickland (D) for Congress

Washington
2020
House